Cudworth is a ward in the metropolitan borough of Barnsley, South Yorkshire, England.  The ward contains two listed buildings that are recorded in the National Heritage List for England.  Both the listed buildings are designated at Grade II, the lowest of the three grades, which is applied to "buildings of national importance and special interest".  The ward contains the village of Cudworth and the surrounding area.  Both the listed buildings are to the west of the village, and consist of a free-standing chimney and a guide stoop, or milestone.


Buildings

References

Citations

Sources

 

Lists of listed buildings in South Yorkshire
Buildings and structures in the Metropolitan Borough of Barnsley